Georgios Bountopoulos (born 27 July 1990) is a Greek professional footballer who plays as a winger for Panargiakos.

Career
He started his career from the youth team of Levadiakos in 2009. A year later he signed a professional contract and moved to the first squad, where he managed to play only in 3 games in the Super League. Thus, in the season 2013-14 he was given on loan to the Cretan Second Division club AO Chania where he had a full season with 24 league games. In the season 2014-15, Bountopoulos signed with Paniliakos, in the Greek Football League. After the dissolution of the team due to major financial problems, he moved on 1 January 2015 to Panachaiki. On 23 of July 2015, he moved to AEL and signed a 3-years contract. On 31 January 2016, he solved his contract with the club by mutual agreement. 
He spent the 2016-2017 season to Sparti, recording 27 appearances with 7 goals and 5 assists. Due to the club's financial problems he left in search of another team. On 12 July 2017 he joined Trikala on a one-year contract.

References

External links
 amazing goal Vs AEK Athens (video)
 myplayer.gr (Greek)
 superleaguegreece.net (Greek)

1990 births
Living people
Levadiakos F.C. players
Athlitiki Enosi Larissa F.C. players
Paniliakos F.C. players
Panachaiki F.C. players
Greek footballers
Trikala F.C. players
A.E. Sparta P.A.E. players
Association football forwards
Footballers from Pyrgos, Elis